Đoni Tafra (born 23 February 1968) is a Croatian retired football player.

Career
Tafra started his career in Hajduk Split. He did not make any appearances in official matches, he did however play one friendly match.

Tafra made the biggest mark as a goalkeeper with HNK Rijeka, collecting 176 Prva HNL caps over seven seasons. He is regarded as one of Rijeka's top goalkeepers of all time, particularly since the 1990s, and is remembered by his heroics during the finish of the 1998–99 Prva HNL season. During the 1996–97 Prva HNL season he did not concede a goal for 470 minutes.

Honours
NK Ogulin
4. HNL - Karlovac County: 2004-05

Career statistics

References

1968 births
Living people
Footballers from Split, Croatia
Association football goalkeepers
Yugoslav footballers
Croatian footballers
HNK Hajduk Split players
HNK Šibenik players
HNK Rijeka players
NK Varaždin players
Yugoslav Second League players
Croatian Football League players
HNK Rijeka non-playing staff